Staples is a city in Todd and Wadena counties in the U.S. state of Minnesota. The population was 2,989 at the 2020 census.

History
Staples developed around a sawmill. The settlement was originally called Staples Mill, and under the latter name was platted in 1889, and named for Samuel and Isaac Staples, businessmen in the lumber industry.

Geography

U.S. Route 10 and Minnesota State Highway 210 are two of the main routes in the city. The Empire Builder, an Amtrak route connecting Chicago with Seattle and Portland, Oregon, stops at the train station in Staples.

Demographics

2010 census

As of the census of 2010, there were 2,981 people, 1,222 households, and 696 families living in the city. The racial makeup of the city was 95.9% White, 0.5% African American, 0.9% Native American, 0.7% Asian, 0.3% from other races, and 1.6% from two or more races. Hispanic or Latino of any race were 1.5% of the population.

There were 1,222 households, of which 30.5% had children under the age of 18 living with them, 39.0% were married couples living together, 12.7% had a female householder with no husband present, 5.3% had a male householder with no wife present, and 43.0% were non-families. 37.0% of all households were made up of individuals, and 16.8% had someone living alone who was 65 years of age or older. The average household size was 2.26 and the average family size was 2.94.

The median age in the city was 38.8 years. 24.1% of residents were under the age of 18; 10% were between the ages of 18 and 24; 21.8% were from 25 to 44; 22.5% were from 45 to 64; and 21.6% were 65 years of age or older. The gender makeup of the city was 47.6% male and 52.4% female.

2000 census
As of the census of 2000, there were 3,104 people, 1,278 households, and 732 families living in the city. The racial makeup of the city was 97.49% White, 0.26% African American, 0.81% Native American, 0.35% Asian, 0.23% from other races, and 0.87% from two or more races. Hispanic or Latino of any race were 1.48% of the population. 33.5% were of German, 12.5% Norwegian, 6.4% American, 6.0% Irish and 5.9% Swedish ancestry.

There were 1,278 households, out of which 30.5% had children under the age of 18 living with them, 41.8% were married couples living together, 12.1% had a female householder with no husband present, and 42.7% were non-families. 35.8% of all households were made up of individuals, and 19.2% had someone living alone who was 65 years of age or older.  The average household size was 2.36 and the average family size was 3.09.

In the city, the population was spread out, with 27.2% under the age of 18, 11.4% from 18 to 24, 24.0% from 25 to 44, 18.6% from 45 to 64, and 18.8% who were 65 years of age or older.  The median age was 36 years. For every 100 females, there were 92.4 males.  For every 100 females age 18 and over, there were 91.6 males.

The median income for a household in the city was $25,208, and the median income for a family was $33,472. Males had a median income of $26,481 versus $18,407 for females. The per capita income for the city was $14,244.  About 15.4% of families and 20.3% of the population were below the poverty line, including 23.9% of those under age 18 and 9.4% of those age 65 or over.

Notable people
 Norbert P. Arnold, Minnesota State Senator
 Loren Bain, pitcher for the San Francisco Giants of Major League Baseball
 Dick Bremer, TV broadcaster for the Minnesota Twins 
 Kathryn Edin, William Church Osborn Professor of Sociology and Public Affairs, at Princeton University
 Guy Doud, 1986 National Teacher of the Year.
 Richard Nelson Gardner (1881-1953), Minnesota state senator and lawyer
 Jon Hassler (March 30, 1933 – March 20, 2008), American writer and teacher known for his novels about small-town life in Minnesota
 Dave Joerger, an American professional basketball coach, who was the coach with the Sacramento Kings of the National Basketball Association (NBA)
 Alfred E. Perlman, President of the New York Central Railroad and Western Pacific Railroad
 Bruce G. Nelsen, Minnesota legislator
 Frankie Thorn, actress
 Dallas Sams, Minnesota legislator
 Gil Skeate, fullback for the Green Bay Packers of the NFL
LaVyrle Spencer, best-selling author of contemporary and historical romance novels, attended high school in Staples
MrBeast, American YouTuber With over 100 Million subscribers
Adolf Hitler, former German chancellor, also know for causing WWII, The Holocaust, and many other tragedies.

Transportation
The Amtrak station sees more than 5,000 riders a year get on or off the daily Empire Builder service. The west bound train from Chicago and St Paul arrives an hour or two after midnight, heading toward Fargo and Seattle/Portland. East bound Empire Builders from Fargo arrive about 4 a.m. heading toward a daylight arrival in St Paul and an afternoon arrival in Chicago.

There is also a municipal airport.

Media
The official weekly newspaper of Staples is the Staples World, with a circulation of 2,400.

Government
Staples' current City Council members are Ron Murray (Mayor), Roy Miles (Mayor Pro-Tem), Mary Theurer, Mary Jo Goff, Doug Case, John Jewison and Blake Gerard.

The City Administrator is Jerel Nelsen. Other department heads include Tara Greer, Clerk; Melissa Wyman, Economic Development; Melissa Birkholtz, Police Chief; Cole Yungbauer, Fire Chief; Scott Grabe, Public Works; Lacey Aguirre, Parks & Recreation.

References

Cities in Minnesota
Cities in Todd County, Minnesota
Cities in Wadena County, Minnesota